Lists of marquessates or marquisates include:
 List of marquessates in the peerages of Britain and Ireland
 List of marquisates in Norway
 List of Polish noble families with the title of Marquess
 List of marquisates in Portugal

See also 

 List of marquesses in the peerages of Britain and Ireland
 Margrave
 List of marches